Honalo is a census-designated place (CDP) in Hawaii County, Hawaii, United States. The population was 2,423 at the 2010 census, up from 1,987 at the 2000 census.

Geography
Honalo is located on the western side of the island of Hawaii at  (19.559309, -155.929832). It is bordered to the north by Holualoa, to the south by Kealakekua, and to the west by Kahaluu-Keauhou. Hawaii Route 11 runs through western part of the community, leading north  to Kailua-Kona and south  to Naalehu. Hawaii Route 180 is a secondary route that branches off Route 11 in Honalo and runs to the east of it.

Demographics

2000 Census data

As of the census of 2000, there were 1,987 people, 717 households, and 504 families residing in the CDP. The racial makeup of the CDP was 38.70% White, 0.50% African American, 0.35% Native American, 20.84% Asian, 9.41% Pacific Islander, 1.06% from other races, and 29.14% from two or more races. Hispanic or Latino of any race were 10.57% of the population.

There were 717 households, out of which 32.5% had children under the age of 18 living with them, 49.8% were married couples living together, 14.2% had a female householder with no husband present, and 29.7% were non-families. 22.0% of all households were made up of individuals, and 8.6% had someone living alone who was 65 years of age or older.  The average household size was 2.75 and the average family size was 3.15.

In the CDP the population was spread out, with 25.5% under the age of 18, 7.1% from 18 to 24, 26.6% from 25 to 44, 26.5% from 45 to 64, and 14.2% who were 65 years of age or older.  The median age was 39 years. For every 100 females, there were 98.9 males.  For every 100 females age 18 and over, there were 96.3 males.

The median income for a household in the CDP was $43,125, and the median income for a family was $46,827. Males had a median income of $27,270 versus $23,098 for females. The per capita income for the CDP was $17,584.  About 13.0% of families and 19.1% of the population were below the poverty line, including 26.7% of those under age 18 and 6.2% of those age 65 or over.

History
The Daifukuji Soto Zen Mission was built in Honalo in 1921.

References

Census-designated places in Hawaii County, Hawaii
Populated places on Hawaii (island)